Michael Freiter (born 15 January 1996) is an English footballer who currently plays for National League South club Hemel Hempstead Town.

Club career
He made his first and only appearance in the English Football League, coming off as a substitute for Gillingham during a 3–1 win against Notts County on 3 May 2015 during the 2014–15 season. He was released after the 2015–16 season.

Career statistics

References

External links
 
 

1996 births
Living people
Footballers from Kent
English footballers
Association football midfielders
Gillingham F.C. players
Staines Town F.C. players
East Thurrock United F.C. players
Cray Wanderers F.C. players
Lordswood F.C. players
Alfreton Town F.C. players
Sittingbourne F.C. players
Hemel Hempstead Town F.C. players
English Football League players
National League (English football) players
Isthmian League players